Neil Sinclair (born 23 February 1974), is a Northern Irish former professional boxer who competed from 1995 to 2010. He challenged once for the WBO welterweight title in 2010. At regional level, he held the British welterweight title from 2001 to 2003 and challenged once for the EBU European Union title in 2008. As an amateur, he won a bronze medal representing Ireland at the 1992 Junior World Championships and gold while representing Northern Ireland at the 1994 Commonwealth Games.

Amateur career
Sinclair boxed for Ireland as an amateur and won a bronze medal at the World Junior Championships at Montreal in 1992 and also won a gold for Northern Ireland at the 1994 Commonwealth Games in Victoria, British Columbia, Canada.

Professional career

Sinclair turned professional in April 1995, winning his first fight at the Ulster Hall, Belfast, in which he knocked out Marty Duke on a card that included Darren Corbett and the final fight in the career of Damien Denny.

In June 2007, Sinclair announced his retirement although he decided to return to boxing within a couple of months.

In May 2009, Sinclair won the Irish light-middleweight title with a stoppage victory over Henry Coyle at the Odyssey Arena, Belfast.

Writing
He used to write a regular column for Irish-boxing.com, entitled Sinky Says.

Professional boxing record

See also
 List of British welterweight boxing champions 
 Neil was classed as one of the hardest punchers and deceivingly clever boxer by Paci Collins, brother of former super middleweight champion, Steve Collins.
 Neil is close friends with Anglo/Irish cruiserweight boxer Joseph Armstrong.

References

External links
 
 

1974 births
Living people
Irish male boxers
Light-middleweight boxers
Prizefighter contestants
Boxers from Belfast
Male boxers from Northern Ireland
Commonwealth Games gold medallists for Northern Ireland
Commonwealth Games medallists in boxing
Boxers at the 1994 Commonwealth Games
Medallists at the 1994 Commonwealth Games